Lebanese International Airways was a Lebanese airline based in Beirut. Formed with help from Pan Am, it began scheduled flights in January 1956, and by 1958 had expanded its network through agreements with Sabena of Belgium. By the mid-1960s, LIA's destinations included Tehran, Kuwait City, Baghdad, Bahrain, Paris, and Milan. Operations ceased in January 1969, after most of its fleet was destroyed by an Israeli military raid on Beirut International Airport. The airline was taken over by Middle East Airlines Air Liban.

Fleet
Aircraft operated by LIA included

 Convair 990
 Curtiss C-46 Commando
 Douglas DC-3/C-47
 Douglas DC-4
 Douglas DC-6
 Douglas DC-7

References

External links
Photo of LIA Convair Coronado
List of Lebanese airlines

Defunct airlines of Lebanon
Airlines established in 1956
Airlines disestablished in 1969
1956 establishments in Lebanon
1969 disestablishments in Lebanon
Companies based in Beirut